Hostile Makeover is a Lifetime Movie Network film. It is a sequel to the 2009 television movie Killer Hair and is based on the third book in the "Crimes of Fashion" series by Ellen Byerrum.

Cast
 Maggie Lawson as Lacey Smithsonian
 Sadie LeBlanc as Stella Lake
 Sarah Edmondson as Brooke Barton
 Victor Webster as Vic Donovan
 Mark Consuelos as Tony Trujillo
 Mario Cantone as Leonardo
 Serinda Swan as Amanda Manville
 Mary McDonnell as Rose Smithsonian
 Katharine Isabelle as Cherise Smithsonian
 Cindy Busby as Montana McCandless
 Dominic Zamprogna as Tate
 Mark Humphrey as Dr. Gregory Spaulding

Home media
A DVD is available outside the US but iTunes copies of Killer Hair and Hostile Makeover are sold.

External links

Lifetime (TV network) films
2009 television films
2009 films
Television sequel films
Films based on American novels